The 1992 NHL Expansion Draft was an expansion draft held by the National Hockey League (NHL) to fill the rosters of the league's two expansion teams for the 1992–93 season, the Ottawa Senators and the Tampa Bay Lightning. The draft was held on June 18, 1992, in Montreal, Quebec, Canada.

Rules
21 of the 22 franchises in the league at the time of the draft were allowed to protect two goaltenders and fourteen position players (the San Jose Sharks were the only team exempt from protection restrictions as they were an expansion team the previous season). Beyond that, every team had to make available at least one goaltender who had played at least one NHL game.

This clause (known to the league teams far in advance) led to several trades so that teams could fulfill the requirement without exposing their lead goaltenders. It also led to anomalies such as Ray LeBlanc (the star of the 1992 United States Olympic team) being put into the only NHL game of his career so that the Chicago Blackhawks could expose him and not Ed Belfour, Dominik Hasek or Jimmy Waite. To avoid exposing any of their three goaltenders, the Washington Capitals re-signed former goalie Bernie Wolfe, who was 40 years old and last played an NHL game in 1979. League president John Ziegler held up approval of the contract and summoned Capitals general manager David Poile to Toronto to explain himself; not willing to risk being sanctioned, the team signed Steve Weeks instead.

There were 42 players selected in the draft, two from each participating franchise. The Lightning and Senators were each to pick two goaltenders, seven defensemen, and twelve forwards.

Draft results

Post-draft
Among players selected in the 1992 NHL Expansion Draft and then moved before the start of the 1992–93 season were the following:

Tampa Bay:
Frederic Chabot (traded to Montreal for Jean-Claude Bergeron on June 18, 1992)
Tim Hunter (traded to Quebec for future considerations on June 19, 1992)
Jeff Bloemberg (traded to Edmonton for future considerations on September 25, 1992)

See also
1992 NHL Entry Draft
1992 NHL Supplemental Draft
1992–93 NHL season

References
 SensNetwork.com: Ottawa Senators 1992 NHL Expansion Draft Selections
 Usenet post on draft order (copied from The Hockey News)
 Tampa Bay Lightning Media Guide (page 44)

External links
 1992 NHL Expansion Draft player stats at The Internet Hockey Database

Expansion Draft
Expan
Tampa Bay Lightning
National Hockey League expansion drafts